Syed Wahidul Alam was a Bangladesh Nationalist Party politician and a former member of parliament for Chittagong-5.

Career
Alam was an active Liberation War activist during 1971. He was the former Member of Parliament for Chittagong-5 (Hathazari). He served from 1991 to 2006. He was also the whip of the parliament.

Personal life
Alam has two daughters. Elder daughter Shakila Farzana, is a barrister and was joint general secretary of the Supreme Court wing of Bangladesh Jatiyatabadi Ainjibi Forum, a pro-BNP lawyers’ body.

References

Bangladesh Nationalist Party politicians
Living people
8th Jatiya Sangsad members
5th Jatiya Sangsad members
6th Jatiya Sangsad members
7th Jatiya Sangsad members
Year of birth missing (living people)
People from Hathazari Upazila
21st-century Bengalis
Bangladeshi people of Arab descent